The Thad Jones Mel Lewis Orchestra In Europe is a compilation of live recordings made by the Thad Jones / Mel Lewis Jazz Orchestra in Poland and Germany in October 1978.

Release history
All tracks were previously released on one of two WestWind Jazz releases, A Touch of Class and Body and Soul.

Track listing
Disc 1:
 "Samba Con Get Chu" (Brookmeyer) – 13:05
 "Quietude" – 7:36
 "Cecilia Is Love" (Foster) – 6:28
 "I Love You" (Porter) – 5:55
 "And I Love You So" (McLean) – 7:31
 "That's Freedom" (H. Jones) – 9:04
 "The Second Race" – 10:31
 "Willow Weep for Me" – 9:19

Disc 2:
 "Sixty First and Richard" – 12:00
 "Body and Soul" – 7:32 
 "Don't Get Sassy" – 11:07
 "Child Is Born" – 10:17
 "Fingers"  – 15:38
 "Intimacy of the Blues" (Strayhorn) – 18:31
All songs composed by Thad Jones except as noted.

Personnel
 Thad Jones – flugelhorn
 Mel Lewis – drums
 Jim McNeely – piano
 Jasper Lundgaard – bass
 Dick Oatts – alto saxophone
 Steve Coleman – alto saxophone
 Rick Perry – tenor saxophone
 Robert Rockwell – tenor saxophone
 Charles Davis – baritone saxophone
 Ron Tooley – trumpet
 Simo Salminin – trumpet
 Irvin Stokes – trumpet
 Larry Moss – trumpet
 John Mosca – trombone
 Doug Purviance – trombone
 Lolly Bienenfeld – trombone
 Lu Robertson – trombone

References

 ...In Europe (ITM 920004) at allmusic.com

External links
 A Touch of Class (West Wind Jazz WW 2402) at allmusic.com
 Body & Soul (West Wind Jazz WW 2407) at allmusic.com  

2007 compilation albums
2007 live albums
The Thad Jones/Mel Lewis Orchestra live albums